Murrumba Downs railway station is located on the Redcliffe Peninsula railway line in Queensland, Australia. It serves the suburb of Murrumba Downs in the Moreton Bay Region opening on 4 October 2016.

Services
Murrumba Downs is served by trains operating from Kippa-Ring to Roma Street and Springfield Central. Some afternoon weekday services continue to Ipswich.

Services by platform

Transport links
Thompsons Bus Service operates one route via Murrumba Downs station:
679: Murrumba Downs to North Lakes

References

Railway stations in Moreton Bay Region
Railway stations in Australia opened in 2016